Sun Music is India's first 24-hour music pay television channel led by the well-known Sun TV Network of India. The channel features Tamil music from Kollywood. Most of the shows in Sun Music requires call-in audience participation, where the callers speak to a video jockey and request songs that may be dedicated to their loved ones.

Sun Music is currently broadcast in many other countries apart from India such as Malaysia and Dubai. Sun Music is available 24/7 in Malaysia on Astro Channel 212 and in Singapore on StarHub TV Channel 134, Singtel TV Channel 627.

Its HD counterpart was launched on 11 December 2011.

VJs

 Manimegalai
 Adam
 Anjana
 Anju 
 Anandha Kannan
 Arun
 Blade Deena
 Dinesh
 Diya
 Durai Raj
 Hema Sinha
 Jerry
 Kajal
 Kathirravan
 Malmaruga 
 Maheshwari
 Niveditha
 Pooja
 Prajin
 Rakesh
 Ranjith
 Sam
 Akshayaa
 Sangeetha
 Sridevi
 Sarithiran
 Shakthi
 Sri hari
 Suresh
 Sastika
 RJ Syed
 Varalakshmi
 Vyshnavee

 Premshyaam

See also
 List of Tamil-language television channels

References

VJ Rio Raj Biodata

External links
 Sun Music's official website
 Sun Music on YouTube
 Sun TV Network
 Sun Group
 Sun Music program guide

Channel Head:Ganesan.V

Music television channels in India
Tamil-language television channels
Sun Group
2004 establishments in Tamil Nadu
Television stations in Chennai
Television channels and stations established in 2004